Dragonfire is a British laser directed-energy weapon technology demonstrator. It was first unveiled to the public in 2017 at the DSEI conference in London and is being developed by UK Dragonfire, a consortium consisting of MBDA UK, Leonardo UK, Qinetiq and Dstl. As a technology demonstrator, it will be used to assess laser directed-energy weapons and their potential applications within the British Armed Forces.

Development
The weapon was first shown publicly at the 2017 DSEI conference in London. A contract worth £30 million was subsequently awarded by Dstl to an industry consortium, named UK Dragonfire, led by MBDA UK with QinetiQ, Leonardo, GKN, Arke, BAE Systems and Marshall Land Systems participating, to develop a technology demonstrator. Trials were to begin in 2018, followed by a major demonstration in 2019, however the COVID-19 pandemic and technical problems caused delays. It was ultimately deployed on trials in 2022 on the ranges in the Outer Hebrides, Scotland. According to MBDA, these initial low power trials proved Dragonfire's ability to track air and sea targets with exceptionally high accuracy. This was followed by high power trials in November 2022, where the weapon engaged targets using its high power laser in operationally-representative scenarios.

Characteristics
Dragonfire uses UK-pioneered beam combining technology to deliver a laser beam with increased power density, reduced defeat times and increased effective range. This is achieved, in part, through the use of tens of glass fibres, however the full technical approach remains classified. The laser and its associated targeting systems, including an electro-optical camera and second lower-power laser for imaging and tracking, are mounted to a turret. The laser is reportedly in the 50 kW class and is designed to defend land and maritime targets from threats such as missiles and mortars. Its energy demands may be met by a Flywheel Energy Storage System (FESS), a joint UK-US innovation currently in development.

The UK envisages high energy laser weapons, like Dragonfire, onboard future Royal Navy warships, British Army armoured vehicles and fighter aircraft of the Royal Air Force, including Tempest; it aims to demonstrate these concepts on board a Type 23 frigate and a Wolfhound armoured vehicle.

References

Military lasers
 Directed-energy weapons